

E 
Efteling (Kaatsheuvel, Netherlands)
Eldorado Amusement Park (Weehawken, New Jersey, United States)
Elitch Gardens (Denver, Colorado, United States)
Emerald Park (Ashbourne, Meath, Ireland)
Enchanted Forest (Salem, Oregon, United States)
Enchanted Kingdom (Santa Rosa, Laguna, Philippines)
Energylandia (Zator, Poland)
Enchanted Parks (Federal Way, Washington, United States)
Escape Theme Park (Pasir Ris, Singapore)
Essel World (Mumbai, India)
Europa-Park (Rust, Germany)
Everland (Yonggin, Gyeonggi, Seoul, South Korea)
Exhibition Park (Saint John, New Brunswick, Canada) (annual)
Expoland (Osaka, Japan)

F 
Family Kingdom (Myrtle Beach, South Carolina, United States)
Fantasilandia (Santiago, Chile)
Fantasy Island (Ingoldmells, Lincolnshire, England)
Fantasy Kingdom (Ashulia, Savar, Bangladesh)
Ferrari Land (Salou, Tarragona, Spain)
Ferrari World Abu Dhabi (Yas Island, Abu Dhabi, United Arab Emirates)
Flambards Experience (Helston, Cornwall, United Kingdom)
Flamingo Land (Kirby Misperton, North Yorkshire, England)
Foy's Lake Concord, (Bangladesh)
Fort Fun Abenteuerland (Bestwig, Germany)
Fraispertuis City (Jeanménil, France)
Frontier City (Oklahoma City, Oklahoma, United States)
Frontierland Western Theme Park (Morecambe, Lancashire, England)
Fuji-Q Highland (Fujiyoshida, Yamanashi, Japan)
Fun Fair Park (Baton Rouge, Louisiana, United States)
Fun Mountain (Gatlinburg, Tennessee, United States)
Fun Spot America (Fayetteville, Georgia, United States)
Fun Spot America (Kissimmee, Florida, United States)
Fun Spot America (Orlando, Florida, United States)
Fun Spot Park (Angola, Indiana, United States)
Funtown Splashtown USA (Saco, Maine, United States)
Funtasia Water Park (Patna, India)
Futuroscope (Poitiers, France)

G 
Galaxyland (Edmonton, Alberta, Canada)
Gardaland (Peschiera del Garda, Italy)
Geauga Lake (Aurora, Ohio, United States)
Genting Highlands (Kuala Lumpur, Malaysia)
Gilroy Gardens (Gilroy, California, United States)
Great Escape (Queensbury, New York, United States)
Green Land Amusement Park (Kumamoto, Japan)
Gröna Lund (Stockholm, Sweden)

H 
Lake Hamana Palpal (Hamamatsu, Shizuoka, Japan)
Hamel's Amusement Park (Shreveport, Louisiana, United States)
Hansa-Park (Sierksdorf, Lübeck, Germany)
Haw Par Villa (Singapore)
Heide Park (Soltau, Germany)
Hersheypark (Hershey, Pennsylvania, United States)
Himeji Central Park (Himeji, Hyogo, Japan)
Holiday Park (Habloch, Germany)
Holiday World & Splashin' Safari (Santa Claus, Indiana, United States)
Hong Kong Disneyland Resort (Hong Kong, China)
Hong Kong Disneyland 
Hopi Hari (Campinas, Brazil)
Hurricane Bay (Louisville, Kentucky, United States)

E

nl:Lijst van attractieparken (E-H)
sv:Lista över nöjesparker (E-H)